"Kiss from a Rose" is a song from British singer-songwriter Seal's second eponymous album (1994). The song was first released as a single in July 1994 and included in the film The NeverEnding Story III that year. It was re-released a year later in 1995 as part of the Batman Forever film soundtrack, helping it top the charts in the United States and Australia. It also reached the top 10 in several other countries, including Canada, France, Iceland and Norway. At the 1996 Grammy Awards, it won awards for Record of the Year, Song of the Year, and Best Male Pop Vocal Performance.

Background
"Kiss from a Rose" was written in 1987, several years prior to the release of Seal's eponymous debut album from 1991. After writing the song, Seal felt "embarrassed by it" and "threw the tape in the corner". Seal did not present it to producer Trevor Horn until the recording sessions for Seal II. In 2015, Seal said of the song: "To be honest, I was never really that proud of it, though I like what Trevor did with the recording. He turned that tape from my corner into another 8 million record sales and my name became a household name".

"Kiss from a Rose" was the second single taken from the Batman Forever film soundtrack, and topped the US Billboard Hot 100 for one week in August 1995. It also went to number four on the UK Singles Chart, where it had originally reached number 20 in 1994. It also was nominated for the MTV Movie Award for Best Song from a Movie in 1996.

Seal talked about the long, strange journey that the song went through on The Brian McKnight Show season finale that aired 30 May 2010. He described how the song initially dropped out of the charts shortly after its release. Joel Schumacher subsequently called Seal, and requested use of the song to play over a love scene between the characters played by Nicole Kidman and Val Kilmer in Batman Forever.

Critical reception
Chuck Campbell from Knoxville News Sentinel felt that "fairy-tale-ish melodies and harmonies" uplift "Kiss from a Rose". Pan-European magazine Music & Media commented, "Sealed with a kiss, here you get a ballad and a half! It's got the right pathos and the unavoidable violins. The thorn, needed to show the sincerity, comes from the razor sharp alto sax". Alan Jones from Music Week wrote, "Seal's magnificent "Kiss from a Rose" – now subtitled "Love Theme from Batman Forever" – is back a mere year after its first release when it reached number 19. A complex yet melodic song, it has remained a radio staple since it was first released, and is ready to explode". 

The song's cryptic lyrics have been the subject of debate since its release. In 2015, Seal provided verified commentary on the "Kiss from a Rose" entry on the website Genius, stating simply: "I have avoided explaining these lyrics for over 25 years. I am not going to start doing it now".

Music video
Two versions of the music video were produced:
 The original version is set in a photographic studio and was co-directed by Matthew Rolston and William Levin. The 1966 film Blowup was heavily referenced in the video.
 The second version was directed by Joel Schumacher and has Seal performing the song beside the Bat-Signal, interspersed with clips from the film Batman Forever. This is the more well known video of the song. The director of photography of this version of the music video was Neil Abramson.

Track listing
Between all the formats of the single release, bonus tracks include the non-album tracks "The Wind Cries Mary" (a Jimi Hendrix cover) and "Blues in 'E'"; remixes of "Kiss from a Rose" by Adamski (who produced the original version of "Killer"); and remixes of album track "I'm Alive" by Steve Fitzmaurice and Sasha with BT.

 "Kiss from a Rose"  – 3:38
 "Kiss from a Rose"  – 4:47

Charts and sales

Weekly charts

Year-end charts

Decade-end charts

All-time charts

Certifications

See also
List of number-one singles in Australia during the 1990s
List of Hot 100 number-one singles of 1995 (U.S.)
List of Hot Adult Contemporary number ones of 1995
List of Mainstream Top 40 number-one hits of 1995 (U.S.)

References

1990s ballads
1994 singles
1994 songs
1995 singles
Batman (1989 film series)
Batman music
Billboard Hot 100 number-one singles
Contemporary R&B ballads
Grammy Award for Best Male Pop Vocal Performance
Grammy Award for Record of the Year
Grammy Award for Song of the Year
Number-one singles in Australia
Pop ballads
Seal (musician) songs
Song recordings produced by Trevor Horn
Songs written by Seal (musician)
Warner Records singles
ZTT Records singles
Songs about flowers
Songs about kissing